Bishop André Lefèbvre (26 January 1902, Belgium – 15 May 1991) was a Roman Catholic bishop.

He was Vicar Apostolic (1955) and then Bishop of the Roman Catholic Diocese of Kikwit (1959–1967), and titular Bishop of Raphanea (1955) and then the Diocese of Thucca Terenbenthina (1967–1976).

References

1902 births
1991 deaths
20th-century Belgian Roman Catholic priests
20th-century Roman Catholic bishops in the Democratic Republic of the Congo
20th-century Roman Catholic titular bishops
Roman Catholic bishops of Kikwit